There are two different types of world currency unit in use today that have different origins and usages.

History 
The WCU was proposed by Lok Sang Ho of Lingnan University, Hong Kong. The WCU was first intended to be the basis for denominating global bonds, a debt instrument that is issued globally and is subscribable by people and institutions around the world.  Simply put, it is a GDP-weighted basket of key currencies each of which is indexed against inflation for the relevant countries.  The WCU is defined with respect to a base year, so that each unit represents the same global purchasing power as at that base year, when it is equal to US$1.  If there is inflation, the WCU will be worth more than $1 after the base year, but will represent the same purchasing power.  The unindexed basket, called the benchmark basket of key currencies, is the basis for the derivation of effective exchange rate indices that has been demonstrated to be both easy to compile and superior to most official effective exchange rate indices.

Rhett Morson has advocated the Standard Earth Monetary Unit (SEMU) since 1998 and continues to argue in support for it. However, it is not practicable to introduce it in one step for political reasons and so the preferred method of introduction is for countries to gradually move their currencies closer or in some cases to adopt another country's currency as a series of steps inching closer to the SEMU. Examples could include countries that have already adopted the US dollar as their currency or Australia and New Zealand joining forces or Pacific Islands adopting a larger country's currency.
Ideally, the SEMU would coincide with trade barriers being removed and international laws moving into alignment.

How it works 
Today, there are two distinct products which have adopted the name "world currency unit".

The WOCU 
The WOCU (contraction of "world currency unit") is a standardized basket of currencies — the national currencies of the 20 largest national economies measured by GDP, established in 2008. The basket is reweighed semi-annually according to the relative growth of the economies, whereby constituent currencies are replaced by other currencies should the size of the GDP be overtaken by that of another national economy. Conceived as an apolitical and global alternative to the ECU, it is used as a reference currency for global investors and companies seeking to mitigate bilateral exchange rate volatility.

The WCU 
The World Currency Unit (WCU) is an indexed unit of account that stands for a unit of real global purchasing power.

Since each unit by design represents a stable unit of purchasing power, the stipulated interest rate on WCU-denominated bonds represents a real interest rate. In principle, the common denomination of bonds by issuers from different parts of the world using the WCU, as well as the greater transparency of real interest rates, will produce more efficient capital markets, as savers and borrowers around the world converge in their understanding of what each basis point of interest means and are protected against two key sources of uncertainty, namely inflation and exchange loss risks.

See also

 International dollar
 Special drawing rights
 North American monetary union
 African monetary union
 Bancor

References
 
 Coats, Warren(1989) "In Search of a Monetary Anchor : A 'New' Monetary Standard," IMF Working Paper No. 89/82.

External links
Wocu website
WCU website (missing!)
__notoc__
Monetary economics
Proposed currencies